Stephen James Hunt (born 11 November 1984) is an English retired footballer. He played as a defender.

Early life
He was born in Southampton. Hunt started his career as a trainee at his hometown club.

Football career
After 10 years at the club, he left for Colchester United before making a first team appearance. The start of his Colchester career came when he was sent off 59 seconds into his debut against Chesterfield. He scored his first and only goal for Colchester in a 5–0 win over Walsall. He didn't appear often in Colchester's 2005–06 promotion run-in, making only two substitute appearances, but started three games in the cups. As a result, he was sold to Notts County in June 2006.

After a turbulent start that saw him nearly leave the club before playing a game, he became team captain. On 5 February 2007 Hunt signed a -year contract to keep him at Meadow Lane until June 2009.

The 2009–2010 season was his best with goals against Forest Green and Wigan Athletic in an impressive F.A cup run for the magpies. That ended in the 5th round against Fulham. After playing 39 games he was part of the defensive unit that kept a club record number 26 clean sheets. Hunt was an integral part of the title winning team in the 2009–2010 season.

After subsequent interest from a handful of championship and league 1 clubs he accepted a 2-year contract at Notts County.

In May 2012 he was released by the club, along with 12 other players.

Honours

 Football League Two champions: 2009–10.

References

External links
Stephen Hunt profile at nottscountyfc.co.uk

1984 births
Footballers from Southampton
Living people
Association football defenders
English footballers
Southampton F.C. players
Colchester United F.C. players
Notts County F.C. players
Lincoln City F.C. players
English Football League players